People with the surname Fornaro include:
 Robert Fornaro, (born 1952) CEO of Spirit Airlines
 Carlo de Fornaro (1872-1949), caricaturist and writer

See also
 Fornari (disambiguation)